The Shorland S600 is an armored personnel carrier developed in 1995 as a private venture by Short Brothers plc in Northern Ireland. Unlike the previous Shorland armoured car series, which were based on the Land Rover Defender, Shorts used the much larger chassis and drive-train of the Mercedes-Benz Unimog U1550L/U2150L. In 1996 the Short Brothers sold the complete design to British Aerospace Australia. In 1997 the Kuwait National Guard ordered 22 S600 in five different versions. In 2006, prior to it being acquired by BAE Systems Australia in 2007, Tenix Defence supplied the South Australia Police Special Tasks and Rescue Group with a variant known as the Tenix S-600.

Variants
 Ambulance
 Armoured Personnel Carrier
 Command Vehicle
 Mortar Carrier
 High Pressure Cannon Carrier
 Police Internal Security Vehicle - 12 seater
 Riot Control Vehicle - with light barricade remover
 Surveillance Vehicle

Operators
 - 1 previously used by the South Australia Police Special Tasks and Rescue Group
 - 6 Riot Control Vehicles for the Federal Police
 - 22 in 5 versions (APC, CPV, ambulance, crowd control and mortar carrier) for the Kuwait National Guard
 - Singapore Police Force (Special Operations, Riot Control, Special Security)

See also
 Infantry fighting vehicle
 List of armored fighting vehicles
 Shorland armoured car
 Bushmaster IMV

References

External links
War Wheels - Tenix S600

Armoured personnel carriers
Wheeled armoured personnel carriers
All-wheel-drive vehicles
Internal security vehicles
Armoured cars of the United Kingdom
Military vehicles introduced in the 1990s
Armoured personnel carriers of the United Kingdom
Armoured personnel carriers of the post–Cold War period